The 2017–18 season was  Ipswich Town's 16th consecutive season in the second tier of English football and 140th year in existence. Along with competing in the Championship, the club also participated in the FA Cup and League Cup.

The season covers the period from 1 July 2017 to 30 June 2018.

Kits
Supplier: Adidas / Sponsor: Marcus Evans Group (chest), East Anglian Children's Hospices (back)

First-team squad

Left club during season

First-team coaching staff

Pre-season
On 10 May 2017, Ipswich Town announced a pre-season friendly against Charlton Athletic. The club confirmed Peterborough United as a second confirmed pre-season fixture, with the match split into two games of 60 minutes each. Mick McCarthy's men will travel to Republic of Ireland for a week and play Drogheda United whilst on tour. Colchester United were also confirmed for pre-season opposition. Four days later, Gillingham was added to the list of oppositions to face.

Competitions

EFL Championship

League table

Result summary

Results by matchday

Matches
On 21 June 2017, the league fixtures were announced.

FA Cup

In the FA Cup, Ipswich Town entered the competition in the third round and were drawn at home against Sheffield United.

EFL Cup

On 16 June 2017, the first round draw took place with a trip to Luton Town confirmed. Another away tie was announced, when they were drawn away to Crystal Palace in the second round.

Transfers

Transfers in

Loans in

Transfers out

Loans out

Squad statistics
All statistics updated as of end of season

Appearances and goals

|-
! colspan=14 style=background:#dcdcdc; text-align:center| Goalkeepers

|-
! colspan=14 style=background:#dcdcdc; text-align:center| Defenders

|-
! colspan=14 style=background:#dcdcdc; text-align:center| Midfielders

|-
! colspan=14 style=background:#dcdcdc; text-align:center| Forwards

|-
! colspan=14 style=background:#dcdcdc; text-align:center| Players transferred out during the season

Goalscorers

Assists

Clean sheets

Disciplinary record

Starting 11
Considering starts in all competitions

Awards

Player awards

References

Ipswich Town
Ipswich Town F.C. seasons